Alan Joseph Grindal (born 18 February 1940) is an Australian former cyclist. He competed in the individual road race and team time trial events at the 1960 Summer Olympics.

References

External links
 

1940 births
Living people
Australian male cyclists
Olympic cyclists of Australia
Cyclists at the 1960 Summer Olympics
Place of birth missing (living people)